Murasaki refers to the heroine of The Tale of Genji, after whom the book's author, Murasaki Shikibu, was named by her contemporaries. She was a lady in waiting at the Imperial Court of Japan, around the year 1000. Murasaki Shikibu's given name remains unknown to this day. The word Shikibu is actually no name, but refers to the rank of her father, who was in the Emperor's service as provincial governor.

The Name Murasaki 

The name remained a pseudonym, as due to court manners of the author's time (the Heian period, 794–1185), it was considered unacceptably familiar and vulgar to freely address people by either their personal or family names; within the novel, the character herself, too, is unnamed, as most of the book's characters are never identified by any name, but by their rank and title (in the case of male persons), the rank and title of their male relatives (in the case of female persons), or after the name of their habitation (in the case of the great court ladies). As such, the Genji character Murasaki is often referred to as the "Lady of the West Wing". In most commentaries and translations, she is simply referred to as "Murasaki" for ease of identification and to improve readability.

A Word Game, or, a Famous Color in Literature 
The name Murasaki is inspired by a poem that the novel's hero, Genji, improvises when contemplating his first meeting with the novel's heroine, then a little girl who will grow up to be "Murasaki":

 is the Japanese word for the color purple. Other translations include lavender, as used by Edward Seidensticker in his English version of Genji; violet; and violet root, which in Japanese poetry denotes love and constancy.

This lady Fujitsubo is little Murasaki's aunt. Thus, in a word association game very characteristic of Japanese poetry, the similarity between the two colors – the deep purple of the violet, and the light purple of wisteria – led to the name Murasaki, a well-known name in Japanese literature.

(It is a further twist to this word game, that the novel's Murasaki, the Lady of the West Wing, though certainly turning into a shining example of love and constancy, ends her life in pious resignation, with a jealous demon appearing at her bedside - thereby destroying Genji (the hero).)

References 

The Tale of Genji